Nemanja Nikolić (born 21 February 2001) is a Bosnian professional footballer who plays as a right-back for Greek Super League 2 club Olympiacos B and the Bosnia and Herzegovina U21 national team.

He started his professional career at Mladost Doboj Kakanj, before joining Olympiacos in 2019, who loaned him to Radnički Niš later that year and to Mladost Doboj Kakanj in 2020.

Club career

Early career
Nikolić came through Sarajevo's youth academy, which he left in June 2018 to join Mladost Doboj Kakanj. He made his professional debut against Radnik Bijeljina on 18 August 2018 at the age of 17.

Olympiacos
In August 2019, Nikolić joined Greek side Olympiacos on a four-year contract, but he was immediately loaned to Serbian team Radnički Niš until the end of the season.

In January 2020, he was sent on a six-month loan to his former club Mladost Doboj Kakanj.

International career
Nikolić represented Bosnia and Herzegovina at various youth levels.

Career statistics

Club

References

External links

2001 births
Living people
People from Zvornik
Serbs of Bosnia and Herzegovina
Bosnia and Herzegovina footballers
Bosnia and Herzegovina youth international footballers
Bosnia and Herzegovina under-21 international footballers
Association football fullbacks
FK Mladost Doboj Kakanj players
Olympiacos F.C. players
FK Radnički Niš players
AO Chania F.C. players
Premier League of Bosnia and Herzegovina players
Serbian SuperLiga players
Super League Greece 2 players
Bosnia and Herzegovina expatriate footballers
Expatriate footballers in Greece
Bosnia and Herzegovina expatriate sportspeople in Greece
Expatriate footballers in Serbia
Bosnia and Herzegovina expatriate sportspeople in Serbia
Olympiacos F.C. B players